Karakum (1994) is a Turkmen and German adventure film directed by  and Uzmaan Saparov and produced by Ottokar Runze. The story of the film was written by Arend Agthe and Uzmaan Saparov.

Plot
From Hamburg to Turkmenistan: Robert, a 13-year-old German boy, is on his way to visit his father, who works as an engineer in the Karakum desert. After arriving at the airport, he gets taken there by the truck driver Pjotr. They are joined by Pjotr's nephew Murad, who is on his way to a distant oasis. But during the trip through the desert some things go wrong and the truck gets stuck. While Pjotr sets off to find water, the two boys are waiting in the heat. When Pjotr doesn't return, Robert, a sailing aficionado, has the idea to build a sand sailing rig from parts that are on the truck. Soon, they are off to an adventurous sailing tour through the desert, united — despite cultural differences — by their inventive genius and plenty of youthful thirst for adventure.

Cast 
 Max Kullmann 	as Robert
 Murad Orazov as Murad
 Pjotr Olev as Pjotr
 Neithardt Riedel as Jansen
 Aleksandr Potapov as Boris
 Martin Semmelrogge as Brink
 Victor Marosov as Gregor
 Murat Annageldyyev as Narbiger
 Khodzha Durdy Narliyev as Anführer der Banditen
 Mulkoman Orazov as Bandit
 Anabirdijev Birdinasar as Major der Miliz
 Kurban Dshumajev as Milizsoldat
 Altyn Khodzhayeva as Schwägerin
 Dshenet Orasova as Kleine Schwester
 Ata Dovletov as Alter Mann
 Dshenet Allakulijeva as Enkelin
 Berdy Ashirov as Tankwart

Production 
Arend Agthe conceived the basic plot of the film. Then he and Uzmaan Saparov developed the storyline of the film. The film was produced by Ottokar Runze; and Fred Steinbach and Dietrich Voigtlaender were the executive producers. Music of the film was composed by Martin Cyrus and Matthias Raue. Cinematographer and editor of the film were Michael Wiesweg and Ursula Höf respectively.

Release and reception 
The film was released in 1994 in Turkmenistan and on 10 April 1997 in Germany and received mainly positive reviews from critics. Variety in their review wrote, the film was—
an engaging, sometimes exciting juvenile adventure saga set in the vast deserts of former Soviet republic Turkmenistan, German co-production "Karakum" is solid, non-pandering fare for kids (over 8 or so) and adults alike. Theatrical prospects are good in select countries, along with broader tube play.

References

External links 
 

1994 films
1990s German-language films
German adventure drama films
Turkmenistan films
1990s Russian-language films
1990s German films